Cachí is a district of the Paraíso canton, in the Cartago province of Costa Rica.

Geography 
Cachí has an area of  km² and an elevation of  metres.
It lies near the eastern bank of the man-made Lake Cachí, created by the damming of the Reventazon River which before the 1970s flowed past the town. The town is connected to Ujarrás, on the other side the lake.

Demographics 

For the 2011 census, Cachí had a population of  inhabitants.

Transportation

Road transportation 
The district is covered by the following road routes:
 National Route 224
 National Route 225

Landmarks
The town lies in an area rich with green coffee plantations, with a sugar mill dated to the early twentieth century. Of note is a wooden house built by Macedonio Quesada, the noted costarican wood carver and sculptor who named the house  (Dreamer's House), made entirely from coffee branches and bamboo. The main restaurant of note is La Casona del Cafetal Restaurant. Cachí' contains an Evangelical Church called Espiritu de Vida. The town is divided into several neighborhoods including Calle Boza, Pueblo Nuevo, Loaisa, Peñas Blancas, Primavera, and Volio. There are three elementary schools and one high school.

References 

Districts of Cartago Province
Populated places in Cartago Province